The 1985–86 Cleveland State Vikings men's basketball team represented Cleveland State University in the 1985–86 NCAA Division I men's basketball season. The team was led by third-year head coach Kevin Mackey. In 1984–85, the Vikings finished 21–8 (11–3 in the AMCU-8). It was the 55th season of Cleveland State basketball.

Regular season 
Cleveland State finished the regular season with a 24–3 record and 13–1 in the AMCU-8. That record earned them a #1 seed in the AMCU-8 postseason tournament. They defeated Northern Iowa, Illinois-Chicago, and Eastern Illinois to win the AMCU-8 tournament, however the AMCU-8 would not receive an automatic berth in the NCAA Tournament until the 1986-87 season. Nonetheless, Cleveland State received an at large invitation to the NCAA Tournament based on their overall resume. Cleveland State also won 14 games in a row, a school record that still stands today. The streak started on February 27 at Kent State and lasted all the way until they lost to Navy in the Sweet Sixteen on March 21. In the final AP Top 20 poll of the season Cleveland State received 4 points.

Postseason 
Cleveland State earned a trip to the NCAA Tournament. They were the #14 seed. They defeated Indiana, and St. Joseph, before losing to Navy 71–70. Cleveland State became the first #14 seed to make it to the Sweet Sixteen. The next season the Vikings started the season ranked 20th in the AP Poll. There was no post NCAA Tournament coaches poll in 1986. Cleveland State was ranked 17th in the final USA Today poll. Cleveland State also set a school record for wins in a season at 29, a record that also still stands today. Clinton Smith was named Cleveland States Varsity "C" Club Player of the Year. Ken McFadden was named an All-American fifth team by Basketball Weekly. Clinton Ransey was also a Sporting News honorable mention All-American. Clinton Ransey and Clinton Smith were each named to the AMCU-8 first team. Ken McFadden was named to the AMCU-8 all-newcomer team. Keven Mackey was named the AMCU-8 coach of the year for the 2nd year in a row. Finally Ken McFadden and Clinton Smith were named to the AMCU-8 all-tournament team.

Roster

Statistics 
 Points: Clinton Ransey 535
 PPG: Clinton Smith 16.2
 Rebounds: Eric Mudd 288
 RPG: Eric Mudd 9.6
 Field Goals: Clinton Smith 226
 FG%: Clinton Smith .565
 Assists: Eddie Bryant 146
 APG: Eddie Bryant 4.4
 Blocks: Bob Crawford 25
 BPG: Bob Crawford 0.8
 Steals: Clinton Ransey 67
 SPG: Clint Ransey 2.03
 Free Throws: Ken McFadden 99
 FT%: Ken McFadden .797

AMCU-8 Conference standings

Schedule

Rankings

References 

Cleveland State Vikings men's basketball seasons
Cleveland State
Cleveland State
Cleveland State
Cleveland State